Chasicotherium is an extinct genus of a large notoungulate mammal known originally from a partial skull and mandible discovered in the Arroyo Chasicó Formation, in the stream of Party of Villarino,  Buenos Aires, Argentina. The sediments in which the animal was discovered dates to 10 to 9 million years (Chasicoan). It is known only from the type species, C. rothi. It was a large herbivore of the Miocene Pampas, closely related to Homalodotherium, which also shares the reduced dental formula of the short premaxilla.

References 

Toxodonts
Miocene mammals of South America
 
Neogene Argentina
Fossils of Argentina
Fossil taxa described in 1931
Taxa named by Florentino Ameghino
Prehistoric placental genera